Sir William Howard (by 1225 – 1308) of East Winch and Wiggenhall in Norfolk, England, was a lawyer who became a Justice of the Court of Common Pleas. He is the founder and earliest known male-line ancestor of the House of Howard (Dukes of Norfolk), as is firmly established by  historical research.

Origins
His father was probably from the town of Lynn in Norfolk, where he may have been a merchant.

Career
He is first recorded in surviving records in 1277, when he purchased land within the parish of East Winch in Norfolk, which became his main seat. As he was acting as an attorney for Norfolk clients by the later 1270s, the purchase was presumably made from his earnings as a lawyer. Howard was a serjeant-at-law in the mid-1280s and acted in the eyre courts. From 1285 he served as counsel to the Mayor and Corporation of the flourishing port town of Lynn in Norfolk. He was a Justice of Assize from 1293, and a Justice of the Court of Common Pleas from 1297 until 1307. He is depicted in a surviving stained glass window, circa 1500, in Long Melford Church in Suffolk, dressed in the robes of a judge. Despite 15th century claims by the Howard family that he became Chief Justice of the Court of Common Pleas, there is no surviving evidence to support that assertion. 

In 1298 he purchased the manor house at East Winch from the Grancourt family, and steadily increased his landholding in the parish. Howard attended Parliament in 1302 as a Justice, and was on a trailbaston circuit in 1307. He died at some time before by 24 August 1308, when his replacement as a Justice of Assize is recorded, and was buried in the Church of East Winch.

Marriages and issue
Howard married twice:
Firstly to Alice de Ufford, a daughter of Sir Robert de Ufford, by whom he had issue:
Sir John Howard I (d.1311/33), of East Winch, eldest son and heir, Sheriff of Norfolk, Sheriff of Suffolk and Governor of the City of Norwich in Norfolk, and a Gentleman of the Bedchamber to King Edward I. He married Joan de Cornwall, sister and heiress of Richard de Cornwall and an illegitimate descendant of Richard, Earl of Cornwall, the second son of King John. The son and heir of Sir John Howard I was:
Sir John Howard II (d. post 1388), who was brought up in the king's household and served as Admiral of the Northern Fleet. He married Alice de Boys, the daughter and eventual heiress of Sir Robert de Boys, of Fersfield in Norfolk. They were the great-great-grandparents of John Howard, 1st Duke of Norfolk. His son and heir was:
Sir Robert Howard (d.1388) (predeceased his father) of Wiggenhall and East Winch, who married Margaret Scales (died 1416), daughter of Robert de Scales, 3rd Baron Scales, by his wife Katherine d'Ufford, a daughter of Robert d'Ufford, 1st Earl of Suffolk and a sister and co-heiress of William de Ufford, 2nd Earl of Suffolk. His son was:
Sir John Howard III (c. 1366-1437), of Wiggenhall and East Winch, the grandfather of John Howard, 1st Duke of Norfolk. 
Secondly to Alice Fitton, the daughter and heiress of Sir Edmund Fitton of Fitton Hall in the parish of Wiggenhall, Norfolk, which manor he inherited by the marriage. Only the moat of Fitton Hall survives today. Without issue

References

1308 deaths
13th-century English judges
14th-century English judges
People from King's Lynn
Year of birth uncertain